Kayah i Bregović is a studio album by Yugoslav musician Goran Bregović and Polish singer Kayah, released in 1999 by Zic Zac and BMG Poland. The album was a major commercial and critical success in Poland, spawning the hits "Śpij kochanie, śpij" and "Prawy do lewego".

Background
Kayah and Goran Bregović met at an awards gala in 1998 and started working on the album later that year. The project had to be delayed due to Kayah's pregnancy, and the recording process was challenged by seasonal sickness of the artists – Kayah reportedly recorded vocals in 40-degree Celsius fever. The material consists of various songs from Bregović's repertoire to which Kayah wrote Polish lyrics. Musically, it is a blend of Balkan music and Polish folk, including traditional music of the Gorals and references to Polish Christmas carol "Bóg się rodzi", as well as elements of Romani music. The first two singles released from the album, "Śpij kochanie, śpij" and "Prawy do lewego", met with nationwide popularity in Poland and remain one of the biggest hits in Kayah's repertoire. Further two singles, "To nie ptak" and "Nie ma, nie ma ciebie", released later in 1999, achieved moderate success.

The album met with a major commercial and critical success in Poland. It reached number 1 in monthly sales charts published by Gazeta Muzyczna and ZPAV (official Polish album sales chart OLiS did not exist at the time). On the day of its release, the album was certified gold in Poland, and the day after – platinum, for selling over 100,000 copies. By mid-2000, it had sold in excess of 700,000 copies which earned it a diamond certification in Poland. The album was awarded with a Fryderyk for the Pop Album of the Year. It also won the album award in the Machinery '99 contest and the Best Pop Album award at Superjedynki. Following its nationwide success in Poland, BMG decided to distribute the album in a number of European countries.

Track listing
 "Śpij kochanie, śpij" – 4:31
 "To nie ptak" – 4:40
 "100 lat młodej parze" – 3:09
 "Byłam różą" – 3:41
 "Trudno kochać" – 3:55
 "Prawy do lewego" – 3:25
 "Ta-bakiera" – 4:15
 "Čaje šukarije" – 3:12
 "Jeśli Bóg istnieje" – 4:53
 "Nie ma, nie ma ciebie" – 3:49

Charts

Certifications

References

External links
 Kayah i Bregović on Discogs
 The official Kayah website

1999 albums
Goran Bregović albums
Kayah (singer) albums
Polish-language albums